Christian Funeral Rites in Byzantium are little known and even less studied. Elena Velkova Velkovska makes some studies focusing on Byzantine tradition in Greek language and find out three major periods, namely Early Period (Fourth to Fifth Century), The Euchological Repertory (Eight to Twelfth Century), and The Oldest Rite (Tenth Century).

Early Period (Fourth to Fifth Century)
The Christian Funeral Rites in this period includes the singing of psalms, and the celebration of The Eucharist at the cemetery. There are also commemorations for the third, ninth, and fortieth day after death, a practice that has been kept in the East until today.

The Euchological Repertory (Eight To Twelfth Century)
The Christian Funeral Rites in this period focusing on prayers. Based on Barberini, it is known that there are seven prayers often use: there are three prayers for a deceased person; one is a prayer at the bowing of the head; two are for the burial of laity and bishops; one for a monk; finally a diaconal litany for the dead.

The Oldest Rite (Tenth Century)
The Christian Funeral Rites in this period is single rite: for both laity and monks. It takes place in the church and consist of opening blessing; psalms of Matins are recited. Psalms of Matins can be replaced by Psalm 90 if the deceased is a monk; litany by the deacon and finally singing of "Alleluia".

References

Funeral